Admiral Sir Wilfred Frankland French, KCB, CMG (9 November 1880 – 6 December 1958) was an officer in the British Royal Navy.

Naval career
French entered the Royal Navy in the late 1890s, and was promoted to lieutenant on 1 April 1902. The following month, he was posted to the battleship HMS Goliath, serving at the China station. He received the KCB in 1936.

At the start of the Second World War, French was Admiral Commanding, Orkneys and Shetlands (ACOS). The official report into the disaster cast blame for the weak defences at Scapa on French. Despite having earlier warned of the dangers of attack, and offering to bring a small boat or submarine into the anchorage to prove his point, French was forced to retire from active service, and was posted to Washington as an administrative and maintenance representative, serving there until 1944.

References

Sources
 

|-

1880 births
1958 deaths
Royal Navy admirals of World War II
Knights Commander of the Order of the Bath
Companions of the Order of St Michael and St George
Royal Navy personnel of World War I
People educated at Stubbington House School